Thomas Louis Green (1799–1883) was an English Catholic priest and apologist.

His first posting as a priest was in Norwich from 1828 to 1830 where he gained a reputation as a controversial preacher but refused a public debate because of the chances of anti-Catholic riots. He later became a chaplain to Catholic gentry first to Sir Thomas Clifford-Constable and then after postings in his old seminary in Oscott, a priory in Coventry and two parishes in Shropshire, he became chaplain to Lord Acton in 1860.

He contributed to the Catholic periodicals "Orthodox Journal", "Catholic Magazine" and "True Tablet".

Works
Norwich''' (Norwich, 1830), reprinted under the title "Argumentative Discourses" in 1837A Correspondence between the Protestant Rector of Tixall and the Catholic Chaplain of Sir Clifford ConstableA Letter addressed to Rev. Clement Leigh (London, 1836)The Truth, the Whole Truth, and Nothing but the Truth The Secular Clergy Fund of the late Midland District (London, 1853, privately printed)Rome, Purgatory, Indulgences, Idolatry, etc. Indulgences, Sacramental Absolutions and Tax Tables of the Roman Chancery and Penitentiary considered in reply to the charge of Venality'' (London, 1872, 1880)

References

19th-century English Roman Catholic priests
1799 births
1883 deaths